A matter collineation (sometimes matter symmetry and abbreviated to MC) is a vector field that satisfies the condition,

 

where  are the energy–momentum tensor components. In connection with this, it may be shown that every Killing vector field is a matter collineation (by the Einstein field equations (EFE), with or without cosmological constant). Thus, given a solution of the EFE, a vector field that preserves the metric necessarily preserves the corresponding energy-momentum tensor. When the energy-momentum tensor represents a perfect fluid, every Killing vector field preserves the energy density, pressure and the fluid flow vector field. When the energy-momentum tensor represents an electromagnetic field, a Killing vector field does not necessarily preserve the electric and magnetic fields.

See also
 Affine vector field
 Conformal vector field
 Curvature collineation
 Homothetic vector field
 Spacetime symmetries

Mathematical methods in general relativity